Julius Bayerle (2 June 1826 – 8 August 1873) was a German sculptor and painter as well as a teacher at the Kunstakademie Düsseldorf.

Life 

Bayerle, son of the dressmaker Franz Bayerle (died 1852) and Catharine Abelshausen studied painting at the Kunstakademie Düsseldorf from 1850 to 1860. His teacher there was Friedrich Wilhelm von Schadow. At the Katholieke Universiteit Leuven he found another opportunity for training with Karel Hendrik Geerts. He undertook study trips, including one to Rome, where he stayed from November 1853 to January 1854. In 1854, he returned to Düsseldorf, where he was appointed the first professor of sculpture at the academy, which had been re-founded in 1819. At first he created a series of works with religious content, such as a crucifixion group for Wesel, Christ and the Apostles for Krefeld and a Madonna for Sigmaringen. Bayerle's later works have a more profane, partly also decorative character; among them are statues and monumental sculptures for buildings. Bayerle, Knight of the Order of the Crown (Prussia), died in Düsseldorf at the age of 47.

Work 
 1853: Apostle figures of St. Peter and St. Paul on the west façade of the Neuss Quirinusmünster
 1858:seven still pictures for the 
 1858: Suidbert monument, sandstone, 3.40 metres high, on the Alte Hardt in Elberfeld (not preserved).
 1860: Sandsteindenkmal des Reitergenerals Friedrich Wilhelm von Seydlitz in Kalkar. (not preserved)
 1860:  in Düsseldorf
 1864: Sculpture of St. Suitbert, in a niche on the façade of the listed building on the Suitbertus-Stiftsplatz Nr. 10, Kaiserswerth.
 1861: Statue of the Elector Johann Sigismund in Kleve
 1870: Bust of the painter , 1876 erected on his grave in the Golzheim cemetery (relocated to the Nordfriedhof Düsseldorf)
 1873: Krieger-/Kaiser-Wilhelm-I.-Denkmal vor dem Rathaus von Mülheim an der Ruhr

References

Further reading 
 Bayerle, Julius. In Ulrich Thieme, Felix Becker (ed.): Allgemeines Lexikon der Bildenden Künstler von der Antike bis zur Gegenwart. Begründet von Ulrich Thieme und Felix Becker. Band 3: Bassano–Bickham. Wilhelm Engelmann, Leipzig 1909,  (Textarchiv – Internet Archive).

External links 

 Bayerle, Julius. In Conservations-Lexikon. Allgemeine deutsche Real-Enzyclopädie. 12th edition. Brockhaus, Leipzig 1875, 
 Bayerle, Julius at peter-hug.ch

19th-century German sculptors
19th-century German painters
19th-century German male artists
1826 births
1873 deaths
Artists from Düsseldorf